Knight Lover (subtitled 17 Greatest Hits) is a compilation album by the American actor David Hasselhoff. It was released in July 1989.
The album contains tracks from Hasselhoff's first two studio albums, Night Rocker and Lovin' Feelings, both released on CBS Records.

Track listing

Charts

References 

David Hasselhoff albums
1989 compilation albums
CBS Records compilation albums